Travis Parrott (born August 16, 1980) is an American former professional ATP tennis doubles player. He is primarily a doubles specialist.  Travis is the son of Brian Parrott, a pro tennis organizer who helped bring a pair of Davis Cup events to Portland in the 1980s.

Grand Slam results
Parrott competed in the doubles at the 2008 Wimbledon Championships, where he won his first round match with his partner Filip Polášek against sixth seeded Czech duo Pavel Vízner and Martin Damm. He and Polasek and defeated South African Rik de Voest and Polish player Łukasz Kubot. In the third round, they were defeated by Leander Paes and Lukáš Dlouhý.

Parrott also participated in the 2008 French Open with Polasek, losing in the first round. He was a surprise winner of the mixed doubles 2009 US Open with Carly Gullickson as wildcards. This was the first time they'd ever played together, and Gullickson had originally planned to team with Rajeev Ram.

Doubles finals

Wins (3)

Runners-up (6)

Grand Slam finals

Mixed doubles (1 title)

References

External links
 
 
 Travis Parrott on ESPN.com

American male tennis players
Sportspeople from Portland, Oregon
Tennis people from Oregon
US Open (tennis) champions
Living people
1980 births
Grand Slam (tennis) champions in mixed doubles
Georgia Bulldogs tennis players